is a Japanese voice actor.

Filmography

Anime series
A Certain Scientific Railgun – Gensei Kihara
A Certain Scientific Railgun T – Gensei Kihara
Bleach: Thousand-Year Blood War – Genryūsai Shigekuni Yamamoto
Divine Gate – Gareth
Gin Tama – Sebastian-zou
Highschool of the Dead – Wakisaka
Jewelpet – Genshirou Hatori
Lupin the Third: The Woman Called Fujiko Mine – Dr. Fritz Kaiser
Mitsudomoe – Noda
Sengoku Collection – Chief
Shinkyoku Sōkai Polyphonica – Orson
Sora no Manimani – Shinji Moro'oka
Taishō Baseball Girls – Yōichirō Suzukawa
Yu-Gi-Oh! 5D's – Zeman the Ape King

Original video animation
Katteni Kaizō – Maeda
Mobile Suit Gundam Unicorn – Neo-Zeon Soldier

Original net animation
Shiyakusho – Ishima

Anime films
Bleach: Hell Verse – Murakumo
Lupin the IIIrd: Daisuke Jigen's Gravestone – Malanda Ambassador
Saga of Tanya the Evil: The Movie – Isaac Dustin Drake

Video games
Bleach: Brave Souls – Genryūsai Shigekuni Yamamoto
Overwatch – Torbjörn
Professor Layton and the Miracle Mask – Alford Dalston
Resident Evil 3 – Dario Rosso
Trinity: Souls of Zill O’ll – Dullkina
Yakuza: Like A Dragon - Yamato Totsuka

Dubbing

Live-action
Apollo 18 (John Grey (Ryan Robbins))
Bad Country (Lutin (Tom Berenger))
El Camino: A Breaking Bad Movie (Ed Galbraith (Robert Forster))
Godzilla: King of the Monsters (Houston Brooks (Joe Morton))
Harry Potter and the Deathly Hallows – Part 1 (Death Eater)
In a Better World (Claus (Ulrich Thomsen))
Ip Man 3 (Fat Bo (Kent Cheng))
Ip Man 4: The Finale (Fat Bo (Kent Cheng))
John Wick: Chapter 2 (Abram Tarasov (Peter Stormare))
Joker (Detective Garrity (Bill Camp))
Love (General McClain (Corey Richardson))
Marionette (Oh Kook-chul (Kim Hee-won))
Mary Poppins Returns (The Park Keeper (Steve Nicolson))
Maximum Conviction (Chris Blake (Michael Paré))
Mother of Tears (Padre Johannes (Udo Kier))
The Mummy (Colonel Greenway (Courtney B. Vance))
Parker (Melander (Michael Chiklis))
Perry Mason (Maynard Barnes (Stephen Root))
Really Love (Isaiah Maxwell, Sr. (J. Arthur E. Brooks))
Stand Up Guys (Richard Hirsch (Alan Arkin))
Swamp Shark (Jason 'Swamp Thing' Bouchard (Jeff Chase))
Thor (Agent Garrett (Dale Godboldo))
Thor: Love and Thunder (Rapu (Jonny Brugh))
Warrior (Officer "Big" Bill O'Hara (Kieran Bew))
The Way Back (Dan (Al Madrigal))
What's Your Number? (Mr. Darling (Ed Begley, Jr.))
White Collar (Special Agent Clinton Jones (Sharif Atkins))
Winter Sonata (Park Jong-ho)

Animation
Motorcity (Abraham Kane)
Wreck-It Ralph (Mr. Litwak)
Ralph Breaks the Internet (Mr. Litwak)

References

External links
Official profile 
 

1963 births
Japanese male video game actors
Japanese male voice actors
Living people
Male voice actors from Aomori Prefecture
21st-century Japanese male actors